For the Midsomer Murders character see Tom Barnaby

Thomas Barnaby (17 March 1841 – 23 March 1907) was a Micmac chief from the Eel Ground First Nation band near Newcastle, New Brunswick.

Barnaby was instrumental in the change from a family tradition of leadership in the band to elected leadership. Despite a provision in the Indian Act of 1876 for elections, the traditional chief, John Julian, persevered until his death. In an election in 1888, Thomas was elected by a one-vote margin.

He was considered to have given enlightened leadership to the band and was often consulted by the district Indian superintendent after he had lost a subsequent election. There is no written record from the band's point of view, but a large attendance at his funeral would give testament to his standing within the community.

External links 
  Biography at the Dictionary of Canadian Biography Online
 Thomas Barnaby - Chief (1888-1894)

1841 births
1907 deaths
19th-century First Nations people
Mi'kmaq people
People from Northumberland County, New Brunswick